The 2018 Netherlands Tri-Nation Series was a cricket tournament, that took place in June 2018 in the Netherlands. It was a tri-nation series between Ireland, Netherlands and Scotland, with all the matches played as Twenty20 Internationals (T20Is). The intention is that the tri-series will become an annual event between the three teams.

Prior to the series, Scotland played two T20I matches against Pakistan, while Ireland used the matches as preparation for their matches against India, that took place later in June. Ahead of the series, Ireland named Gary Wilson as their new T20I captain, after William Porterfield stepped aside to focus on Test and One Day International (ODI) cricket.

The fourth match of the series, between Ireland and Scotland, ended in a tie, with no Super Over contested to determine the winner. However, both teams knew that there would not be a Super Over in the event of a tie before the match. The International Cricket Council (ICC) confirmed that there should have been a Super Over, and apologised for the oversight. In the event, the tied game proved pivotal as Scotland won the series, after two wins and a tie, with the Netherlands in second place and Ireland in third.

Squads

Timm van der Gugten, Paul van Meekeren, Roelof van der Merwe and Ryan ten Doeschate were all tentatively named in the Netherlands' squad, with their availability confirmed on a match-by-match basis.

Points table

T20I series

1st T20I

2nd T20I

3rd T20I

4th T20I

5th T20I

6th T20I

References

External links
 Series home at ESPN Cricinfo

2018 in Dutch cricket
2018 in Irish cricket
2018 in Scottish cricket
International cricket competitions in 2018
International cricket competitions in the Netherlands
June 2018 sports events in Europe